Batavia station could refer to:

 the Batavia Depot Museum, a historic train station in Batavia, Illinois
 Batavia station (Lehigh Valley Railroad), a demolished train station in Batavia, New York